The Commander of the Canadian Army is the institutional head of the Canadian Army. This appointment also includes the title Chief of the Army Staff and is based at National Defence Headquarters in Ottawa, Ontario.

History of the position
Prior to 1904, militia forces in Canada were commanded by senior British Army officers appointed as General Officer Commanding the Canadian Militia. British regular forces in the Dominion had their own commander until the withdrawal of the last British garrison in 1906. From 1903 to 1904, the Canadian Militia embarked on a new period of modernization that included the creation of a new office of Chief of the General Staff. Between 1904 and 1964, eighteen officers held the position of Chief of the General Staff, with the last of these, Lieutenant General Geoffrey Walsh, having officially stood down the appointment on 31 August 1964 following the official integration of the three armed services into a single Canadian Armed Forces.

Following the unification of Canada's military forces in February 1968, the majority of Canada's land element was assigned to the newly created Force Mobile Command and the senior Canadian army officer was then known as Commander of Mobile Command from 1965 to 1993. The command was renamed Land Force Command, and its senior officer was known as Chief of the Land Staff from 1993 to 2011. Land Force Command was officially re-designated as the Canadian Army in 2011, at which time the appointment was also renamed Commander of the Canadian Army to reflect this.

Appointees

The following table lists all those who have held the post of Commander of the Canadian Army or its preceding positions. Ranks and honours are as at the completion of their tenure:

|-style="text-align:center;"
!colspan=6|General Officer Commanding the Canadian Militia

|-style="text-align:center;"
!colspan=6|Chief of the General Staff

|-style="text-align:center;"
!colspan=6|Commander of Mobile Command

|-style="text-align:center;"
!colspan=6|Chief of the Land Staff

|-style="text-align:center;"
!colspan=6|Commander of the Canadian Army and Chief of the Army Staff

See also
 Chief of the Defence Staff, the second most senior member of the Canadian Armed Forces after the Commander-in-Chief
 Commander of the Royal Canadian Navy, institutional head of the Royal Canadian Navy
 Commander of the Royal Canadian Air Force, institutional head of the Royal Canadian Air Force

References

External links
 

Canadian Armed Forces
Military appointments of Canada
Army chiefs of staff
Commanders of the Canadian Army